Simbal District is one of eleven districts of the province Trujillo in Peru.

References